The 2003 Edo State gubernatorial election occurred on the 19th of April, 2003. Incumbent Governor PDP's Lucky Igbinedion won election for a second term, defeating ANPP's Roland Owie and three other candidates.

Lucky Igbinedion emerged as the People's Democratic Party (Nigeria) gubernatorial primary. He had Mike Oghiadomhe as his running mate.

Roland Owie defeated Lucky Imasuen in the ANPP gubernatorial primary election to emerge the party's candidate.

Electoral system
The Governor of Edo State is elected using the plurality voting system.

Results
A total of 5 candidates registered with the Independent National Electoral Commission to contest in the election. PDP Governor Lucky Igbinedion won re-election for a second term, defeating ANPP's Roland Owie and four minor party candidates.

The total number of registered voters in the state was 1,432,891. However, only 79.74% (i.e. 1,142,519) of registered voters participated in the exercise.

References 

Edo State gubernatorial elections
Gubernatorial election 2003
Edo State gubernatorial election